The Liturgy of Saint John Chrysostom is the most celebrated divine liturgy in the Byzantine Rite. It is named after its core part, the anaphora attributed to Saint John Chrysostom, Archbishop of Constantinople in the 5th century.

History 
It reflects the work of the Cappadocian Fathers to both combat heresy and define Trinitarian theology for the Christian Church. This liturgy was probably used originally by the School of Antioch (John having been a deacon and priest in Antioch) and, therefore, most likely developed from West Syriac liturgical rites. In Constantinople, it was refined and beautified under John's guidance as Archbishop (398–404). As a divine liturgy of the Church of Holy Wisdom, Hagia Sophia, it became over time the usual divine liturgy in the churches within the Byzantine Empire. Just two divine liturgies (aside from the presanctified), those of Saints John and Basil the Great, became the norm in the Byzantine Church by the end of the reign of Justinian I. After the Quinisext Council and the liturgical reforms of Patriarch Theodore Balsamon, the Byzantine Rite became the only rite in the Eastern Orthodox Church, remaining so until the 19th and 20th Century re-introduction by certain jurisdictions of Western Rites.

The liturgy of Chrysostom was translated into Latin by Leo Tuscus in the 1170s.

Modern classical musical compositions
Besides numerous traditional chants of several schools, the following classical compositions by famous composers include:

 Liturgy of St. John Chrysostom (Stanković), a choral work composed by Kornelije Stanković in 1862.
 Liturgy of St. John Chrysostom (Tchaikovsky), op. 41, a choral work composed by Pyotr Tchaikovsky in 1880.
 Liturgy of St. John Chrysostom (Rimsky-Korsakov), op. 22, a choral work composed by Nikolay Rimsky-Korsakov in 1883.
 Divine Liturgy of St. John Chrysostom (Mokranjac), a choral work composed by Stevan Mokranjac in 1895.
 Liturgy of St. John Chrysostom (Grechaninov), a choral work composed by Alexander Grechaninov in 1897.
 Liturgy of St. John Chrysostom (Ippolotov-Ivanov), a choral work composed by Mikhail Ippolitov-Ivanov in 1903.
 Liturgy of St. John Chrysostom (Kastalsky), a choral work composed by Alexander Kastalsky in 1905.
 Liturgy of St. John Chrysostom (Boksay), a choral work composed by János Boksay in 1906.
 Liturgy of St. John Chrysostom (Paliashvili), a choral work composed by Zakaria Paliashvili in 1909.
 Liturgy of St. John Chrysostom (Rachmaninoff), op. 31, a choral work composed by Sergei Rachmaninoff in 1910.
 Liturgy of St. John Chrysostom (Shvedov), a choral work composed by Konstantin Shvedov in 1911.
 Liturgy of St. John Chrysostom (Chesnokov), a choral work composed by Pavel Chesnokov in 1914.
 Liturgy of St. John Chrysostom (Leontovych), musical setting composed by Mykola Leontovych in 1919.
 Liturgy of St. John Chrysostom (Dinev), a choral work composed by Petar Dinev in 1926.
 Liturgy of St. John Chrysostom (Hristov), a choral work composed by Dobri Hristov in 1934.
 Liturgy of St. John Chrysostom (Tarakanov), a choral work composed by Valeri Tarakanov.
 Liturgy of St. John Chrysostom (Levine), a choral work composed by Alexander Levine in 2006.
 Liturgy of St. John Chrysostom (Alfeyev), composed by Hilarion Alfeyev in 2009.
 The Liturgy of Saint John Chrysostom (Kurt Sander) composed in 2016 using English-language setting; professionally recorded by The PaTRAM Institute Singers, Peter Jermihov-conductor and Soundmirror-Blanton Alspaugh, producer (08/2017); world-premiere performance in Howell, New Jersey (09/20/2017); published by Musica Russica (2019); released by Reference Recordings (04/2019); nominated for Grammy Award for Best Choral Performance (nominations-11/2019; award ceremony-01/2020). 
 Liturgy of St. John Chrysostom (Sheehan), a choral work composed by Rowan Benedict Sheehan in 2018.  Recorded for commercial release by St. Tikhon's Choir, Rowan Benedict Sheehan, conductor and Soundmirror, Blanton Alspaugh.
Other modern compositions of The Liturgy of Saint John Chrysostom include those by Mykola Dyletsky, Maksym Berezovsky, Dmytro Bortniansky, Artemy Vedel, Yevhen Stankovych (2003), Myroslav Skoryk (2005), Roman Hurko  (2000, 2003, 2011), Fr. John Sembrat (2015).

See also
Anaphora (liturgy)
Liturgy of Saint Basil
Liturgy of Saint James

References

Further reading
 Hans-Joachim Schulz, Die byzantinische Liturgie : Glaubenszeugnis und Symbolgestalt,  3., völlig überarb. und aktualisierte Aufl. Paulinus,  Trier  2000, 
 Robert A. Taft, A History of the Liturgy of St John Chrysostom, Pontificio Istituto Orientale, Roma 1978-2008 (6 volumes).
 Robert F. Taft, The Byzantine Rite. A Short History. Liturgical  Press, Collegeville 1992, 
 Hugh Wybrew, The Orthodox Liturgy. The Development of the Eucharistic Liturgy in the Byzantine Rite, SPCK,  London 1989,

External links
 , 1866 translation
 Study Text of the Divine Liturgy of Saint John Chrysostom

Eastern Christian liturgies
Anaphoras (liturgy)
Byzantine Rite
John Chrysostom